Santa Rosalía Airport  is an airport serving the village of Santa Rosalía in the Vichada Department of Colombia.

The runway is alongside the southeastern bank of the Meta River.

See also

Transport in Colombia
List of airports in Colombia

References

External links
OpenStreetMap - Santa Rosalía
OurAirports - Santa Rosalía
Santa Rosalía Airport

Airports in Colombia